Madängsholm is a locality situated in Tidaholm Municipality, Västra Götaland County, Sweden with 425 inhabitants in 2010.

References 

Populated places in Västra Götaland County
Populated places in Tidaholm Municipality